Larry Wayne Micheaux (born March 24, 1960) is an American former professional basketball player who played for several teams in the National Basketball Association (NBA) and in Europe.

Career

College

After earning all-state honors as a senior at E. E. Worthing High School in Houston, Texas, Micheaux attended the University of Houston, where he earned honorable mention All-America honors. He was a member of the Cougars' Phi Slama Jama men's team under head coach Guy Lewis that reached three NCAA Final Fours.  As a senior, he averaged 14 points and 7 rebounds a game during that season while playing alongside Akeem Olajuwon, Clyde Drexler, Alvin Franklin, Benny Anders, Reid Gettys and Michael Young. (Olajuwon and Drexler rank as two of the top 50 NBA players of all time.)

Micheaux led the Cougars in field goal percentage in 1979–80 (.530) and 1980–81 (.600).  He also led the team in blocked shots in 1980–81 with 49.

National Basketball Association

After receiving a business degree at the University of Houston, Micheaux was drafted by the Chicago Bulls in the second round of the 1983 NBA draft.  The 6-foot-9-inch Houston native played two seasons (96 games) with three teams in the NBA: the Kansas City Kings (1983–84), Milwaukee Bucks (1984–85) and Houston Rockets (1984–85).

European basketball

Nicknamed "Mr. Mean", Micheaux spent the next decade playing in the Italian and Spanish basketball leagues. Retired since 1995, he is known as one of the top rebounders in Spanish ACB League history.

Personal life
Micheaux is currently married to Annette (née Collins); they have three children, daughters LaTasha Antoinette (b. 1983) and La Toya Aneise (b. 1987), and son Joshua Christopher (b. 1990). Larry also has three grandsons, kortez jackson (b. 2003), Korendez Jackson (b. 2002), and Israel Elias (b. 2009) from his daughter LaTasha Micheaux.

La Toya was a starter on the Texas A&M women's basketball team, and had a successful four year high school career at Missouri City, Texas's Hightower High School, which included two first team all greater Houston stints. Josh played for the Georgia State University Panthers men's basketball team.

Micheaux currently is the director of several basketball summer camps in Sugar Land, Texas. This includes a fundamentals camp, an advanced fundamental camp, position and games camp, and an elite camp. Micheaux says on his website, "Our goal and commitment is to teach the game of basketball in a fun filled learning environment.  Emphasis is placed on fair play, competition, goal setting, teamwork, and building self esteem.  The committed basketball enthusiasts may attend our programs year around and fine-tune all aspects of their game."

References

External links
Larry Micheaux's NBA statistics

1960 births
Living people
American expatriate basketball people in Italy
American expatriate basketball people in Spain
American men's basketball players
Basketball players from Houston
CB Peñas Huesca players
Chicago Bulls draft picks
Houston Cougars men's basketball players
Houston Rockets players
Kansas City Kings players
Liga ACB players
Milwaukee Bucks players
Pallacanestro Varese players
Power forwards (basketball)
Saski Baskonia players
Valencia Basket players